The Easter Sunday Raid was an air attack on Colombo, Ceylon during the Indian Ocean raid by carrier-based aircraft of the Imperial Japanese Navy on 5 April 1942. The Japanese objective was to destroy the Ceylon-based British Eastern Fleet in harbour. The British preemptively dispersed shipping from the harbours before the attacks due to advance warning from intelligence in March 1942, and air reconnaissance during the raid.

The attacking Japanese aircraft were met by fighters of the Royal Air Force's (RAF) 222 Group, commanded by Air Vice-Marshal John D'Albiac, and the Royal Navy's Fleet Air Arm (FAA), and anti-aircraft artillery. Port facilities were damaged, and ships both in harbour and - having dispersed - on the ocean were sunk or damaged. The bulk of the British Eastern Fleet was not found and survived.

The raid demonstrated Ceylon's vulnerability; British forces were not prepared to face further Japanese carrier raids. The Eastern Fleet relocated its main base to East Africa, from which it regularly deployed carrier task forces into the central and eastern Indian Oceans.

Background

British preparations
Upon Japan's entry into the Second World War, the air defences on Ceylon consisted of only four obsolescent three-inch anti-aircraft guns at Trincomalee. The sole RAF squadron was 273 Squadron based at China Bay near Trincomalee; it flew four Vickers Vildebeest and four Fairey Seals torpedo bombers. With the loss of Singapore in February 1942, British planners identified the island as essential to the defence of India and Allied lines of communication through the Indian Ocean. The threat of Japanese carrier-bourne air attack was recognized from the examples of Pearl Harbor in December 1941 and Darwin in February 1942.

Ceylon's air defences were reinforced in early 1942. On 5 April, there were 37 or 38 serviceable Hurricanes near Colombo. By 4 April, there were 803 and 806 Naval Air Squadrons (NAS) from the FAA, and 44 Fairey Fulmars. The number of anti-aircraft guns increased to 144 by 4 April.

222 Group also received Consolidated PBY Catalina flying boats, which spotted and shadowed the Japanese fleet during the raid. The only air reinforcement to Ceylon in the two months after 7 December 1941 consisted of the first Catalina. By 4 April, there were seven operational aircraft; four RAF, two Royal Canadian Air Force (RCAF), and one Dutch. Two RAF and three Dutch were unserviceable, with at least some being overhauled at Bangalore. Two more RCAF aircraft arrived on 6 and 7 April after the raid started. Squadrons operating Catalinas included 205 Squadron RAF and 413 Squadron RCAF.

Other air reinforcements included maritime and naval strike aircraft.

The airbases at Ratmalana, near Colombo, and China Bay were expanded. Another was established at the Colombo Racecourse to relieve congestion at Ratmalana. The Catalinas operated from Koggala and the adjacent lagoon, near the southern tip of the island. The Japanese were unaware of the bases at the Colombo Racecourse and Koggala.

Colombo and Trincomalee each received a radar station.

The Colombo radar station unit was AMES 254. Its personnel arrived on 18 March and its equipment on 22 March.

The station at Trincomalee was established by AMES 272.

Japanese preparations
The initial IJN order authorizing the raid ("Operation C") was issued on 9 March 1942. By 16 March, the plan was to depart from Staring Bay, Celebes, on 26 March for an attack on Colombo ("C day") on 5 April; these dates were honoured in the actual execution.

First moves
Japanese preparations were detected by Allied intelligence. The British defensive plan was based on assessments from the Far East Combined Bureau (FECB), which expected a "C day" of 1 April. As a result, British forces at Ceylon went on alert a few days too early. Land-based aerial reconnaissance concentrating on the southeast. The deployments accurately reflected the direction that the Japanese would approach.

Ceylon air defences stood down, but long range Catalina patrols continued.

Attack on Colombo

Arrival of the Japanese fleet

The Japanese cancelled a planned reconnaissance of Colombo harbour on 4 April by cruiser floatplanes.

Before dawn on 4 April, Catalina QL-A of 413 Squadron RCAF, piloted by Squadron Leader Leonard Birchall, took off from Koggala to patrol the southernmost patrol sector. Later that day, the crew decided to repeat an assigned leg that took them to the southern-most point of their patrol; the repetition was conducted for navigational purposes. The flying boat was attacked by at least 12 Mitsubishi A6M Zero fighters as it closed to get an accurate sighting. The radio was destroyed mid-transmission so that the sighting, but not the size of the fleet, was reported. Within seven minutes, QL-A was forced to make an emergency landing on the ocean. Strafing Zeroes sank the flying boat and killed two crew members in the water. Only six of the nine crew, including Birchall, survived to be captured by the Japanese destroyer Isokaze. The prisoners claimed to have taken off from Colombo instead of Koggala, and this was reported to the fleet flagship Akagi late on 4 April; Koggala was not struck during the raid. The prisoners also denied making any reports; this was undermined when the Japanese intercepted a signal from Colombo asking QL-A to repeat its report, indicating that surprise was lost.

Catalina FV-R from 205 Squadron RAF, piloted by Flight Lieutenant "Jock" Graham, took off at 17:45 and took over shadowing the Japanese fleet. FV-R made reports at 22:37, and on 5 April at 00:45 and 06:15. The last reported Japanese ships  and 195 degrees from Dondra Head, the southern tip of Ceylon. The Catalina was shot down by Japanese fighters about 90 minutes after making the final report, with the loss of the entire crew.

Within an hour of QL-A's report, D’Albiac met with his subordinates to discuss an anticipated Japanese strike after dawn. 222 Group issued Operation Order No. 43 before midnight to warn subordinate units, and units went on alert at 04:00 on 5 April. Ships were ordered to disperse from the harbours at Colombo and Trincomalee. Cornwall and Dorsetshire left Colombo late on 4 April to rejoin the Eastern Fleet, part of which had started sailing back to Ceylon from Port T after the QL-A report.

At 05:45 on 5 April, Catalina BN-L of 240 Squadron RAF, piloted by Flight Lieutenant Bradshaw, took off to shadow the Japanese fleet.

Failure of British early warning

The Japanese carriers began flying off 91 bombers and 36 fighters for the strike on Colombo shortly after 06:00 on 5 April.

Shortly after 06:40, Catalina BN-L spotted four Japanese aircraft flying north but misidentified them as Hurricanes and made no report. The flying boat was seen by the Japanese; Hiryu received a report of the encounter at 06:45. The strike group approached Colombo from the sea to the south-east; this course prevented detection by coast watchers and the 803 NAS line patrol. AMES 254 and its radar also failed to detect or report the inbound strike.

British fighter pilots waited for a scramble order that, due to the lack of early warning, never came. Instead they were forced take-off under fire, instead of starting the engagement pre-positioned in the air.

The attack

At 07:30, an advance force of nine Zero fighters from Hiryu flew over the Colombo Racecourse airbase and were spotted from the ground. The 14 Hurricanes of 258 Squadron RAF took off in good order by 07:35 and climbed toward the harbour. The airbase avoided attack.

At 07:40, 38 Aichi D3A "Val" bombers from Shokaku and Zuikaku were spotted from Ratmalana. 14 from Zuikaku attacked the airbase at 07:45 as Hurricanes from 30 Squadron RAF were taking off in ones and twos. 21 Hurricanes took off (four were still on the ground when the first bombs fell) and another - the commanding officer's - was disabled attempting to take-off. Six Fulmars from 803 and 806 NAS also took off from Ratmalana. These British fighters were fully occupied defending the airbase, and were aided by heavy cloud cover. The first Hurricanes airborne attacked the bombers before any bombs were dropped. Five Vals and a Zero were destroyed, and up to six more Vals were damaged. In exchange, eight Hurricanes and three Fulmars were shot down. The airbase suffered little damage.

19 Vals from Shokaku attacked the harbour around 07:50; they ultimately sank the armed merchant cruiser  and damaged the submarine depot ship Lucia. They were set upon by 258 Squadron RAF shortly afterwards, which decided to concentrate on bombers rather than the covering Zeros. One Val was shot down, and damaged another, in exchange for eight Hurricanes destroyed and two badly damaged.

The Shokaku Vals fully occupied 258 Squadron RAF, allowing the remaining bombers to attack the harbour and port unimpeded by British fighters. Five Vals from Zuikaku damaged the British tanker San Cirilo. 53 Nakajima B5N "Kate" torpedo bombers, acting as level bombers, sank the old destroyer , damaged the merchant ship Benledi, and hit port facilities.

In addition, the Norwegian tanker Soli was sunk and the British freighter Clan Murdoch was damaged.

The Japanese strike was recovered by their carriers from 09:45 to 10:30.

Second strike cancelled

Carrier Division 5 reserve strike force was armed with high explosive bombs for a second strike on Colombo. This was cancelled when Japanese scout aircraft discovered Dorsetshire and Cornwall at 10:00 on 5 April. Carrier Division 5 reserve strike force was ordered to attack the British cruisers, but rearming with torpedoes encountered delays, and the cruisers were sunk by Carrier Division 2 instead.

Aftermath

British aircraft losses
30 Squadron RAF had seven serviceable aircraft by nightfall. Eight Hurricanes had been shot down, and several damaged. Five pilots were killed and two wounded.

258 Squadron RAF suffered eight Hurricanes shot down and two badly damaged, as well as five pilots killed and two wounded.

803 and 806 NAS suffered four Fulmars shot down and three pilots killed.

Six Fairey Swordfish from 788 Naval Air Squadron were also shot down; they were transferring from China Bay to Colombo for a strike on the Japanese fleet and arrived during the attack.

Radar
According to AMES 254's logs, its radar was operational during the battle and it did not detect the incoming strike. Official post-war technical histories attributed the failure to technical limitations of the radar, and operator error caused by fatigue due to "unequally divided watch-keeping roster."

The short time that AMES 254 had been in Colombo may not have been sufficient to train operators to identify false radar echoes produced by local conditions; real echoes may have been mistaken for false echoes Additionally, the radar antenna projected "lobes" in which objects might be detected, with gaps between lobes or lobes overlapping. The height of an object heavily affected detection range. The trajectory of the incoming Japanese aircraft may have inadvertently taken advantage in gaps between lobes.

AMES 254 may simply not have had enough time to process the radar data, especially if operator fatigue was a factor. During the battle it took five minutes for the Hurricanes to take off and another six to climb to interception altitude. This left only six minutes for AMES 254 to report to No. 20 Operations Room and for orders to be issued to pilots.

Awards
Birchall was awarded the Distinguished Flying Cross for the sighting made by Catalina QL-A on 4 April, and was called the "Saviour of Ceylon" by Canadian media. He was a prisoner of war for the remainder of the war.

British Commonwealth units in Ceylon at the time of the attack

Ground

Ceylonese units
 Ceylon Defence Force
 Ceylon Light Infantry (CLI)
 Ceylon Planters Rifle Corps (CPRC)
 Colombo Town Guard

Commonwealth units
 65th Heavy Anti-Aircraft [HAA] Regiment, Royal Artillery.
 34th Indian Division.
 Australian 16th Brigade (of the 6th Australian Division).
 Australian 17th Brigade (of the 6th Australian Division).
 24th East African Brigade.

Air

Royal Air Force
 No. 222 Group RAF
 No. 11 Squadron RAF (Bristol Blenheims) (Colombo Racecourse)
 No. 30 Squadron RAF (Hawker Hurricanes) (RAF Ratmalana, Colombo)
 No. 258 Squadron RAF (Hawker Hurricanes) (Colombo Racecourse)
 No. 261 Squadron RAF (Hawker Hurricanes) (China Bay, Trincomalee)
 No. 273 Squadron RAF (Fairey Fulmars) (China Bay)
 No. 202 Squadron RAF (PBY Catalina one aircraft)
 No. 204 Squadron RAF (PBY Catalinas)
 No. 205 Squadron RAF (one PBY Catalina aircraft)
 No. 321 Squadron RAF (PBY Catalinas) (Dutch unit under formation at China Bay)
 No. 413 Squadron RCAF (PBY Catalinas)

Fleet Air Arm
 788 Naval Air Squadron (Fairey Swordfish)
 803 Naval Air Squadron (Fairey Fulmars)
 806 Naval Air Squadron (Fairey Fulmars)

See also
 Ceylon in World War II

References

Citations

Sources

External links

 1941–1945 Eastern Travels Part 4 by cjcallis
 The Raids on Ceylon April 1942
 The Battle of Ceylon – 1942
 A short film on YouTube on the Easter Sunday Raid: The Battle of Ceylon Prelude
 A Film Clip on YouTube 'The Saviour of Ceylon' – The Story of Leonard Birchall
 A Film on YouTube on the 'Battle of Ceylon – based on a True Story
 The Battle of Ceylon 1942
 HMS Hermes I Fleet Aircraft Carrier
 Ceylon's Pearl Harbour Attack
 Air raid 1942: No one was asked to resign
 Island at War – Target Ceylon 1942
 Photographs of Ceylon during World War II from Leonard Birchall's 413 Tusker Squadron in 1942

Conflicts in 1942
1942 in Ceylon
South-East Asian theatre of World War II
Military of British Ceylon
Military history of Japan during World War II
Battles of World War II involving Japan
Naval battles of World War II involving the United Kingdom
Battles of World War II involving Canada
World War II aerial operations and battles of the Pacific theatre
Aerial bombing in Sri Lanka
Aerial operations and battles of World War II involving Canada
Aerial operations and battles of World War II involving the United Kingdom
Aerial operations and battles involving Sri Lanka
Military history of Ceylon in World War II
April 1942 events